Marilyn Hacker (born November 27, 1942) is an American poet, translator and critic. She is Professor of English emerita at the City College of New York.

Her books of poetry include Presentation Piece (1974), which won the National Book Award, Love, Death, and the Changing of the Seasons (1986), and Going Back to the River (1990). In 2003, Hacker won the Willis Barnstone Translation Prize. In 2009, she subsequently won the PEN Award for Poetry in Translation for King of a Hundred Horsemen by Marie Étienne, which also garnered the first Robert Fagles Translation Prize from the National Poetry Series. In 2010, she received the PEN/Voelcker Award for Poetry. She was shortlisted for the 2013 PEN Award for Poetry in Translation for her translation of Tales of a Severed Head by Rachida Madani.

Early life and education 
Hacker was born and raised in Bronx, New York, the only child of Jewish immigrant parents. Her father was a management consultant and her mother a teacher. Hacker attended the Bronx High School of Science, where she met her future husband Samuel R. Delany, who would become a well-known science-fiction writer. She enrolled at New York University at the age of fifteen (B.A., 1964). Three years later, Hacker and Delany traveled from New York to Detroit, Michigan and were married. In The Motion of Light in Water, Delany said they married in Detroit because of age-of-consent laws and because he was African-American and she was Caucasian: "there were only two states in the union where we could legally wed. The closest one was Michigan." They settled in New York's East Village.  Their daughter, Iva Hacker-Delany, was born in 1974. Hacker and Delany, after being separated for many years, were divorced in 1980, but remain friends. Hacker identifies as lesbian, and Delany has identified as a gay man since adolescence.

In the '60s and '70s, Hacker worked mostly in commercial editing.  She graduated with a bachelor of arts degree in Romance Languages in 1964.

Career 

Hacker's first publication was in Cornell University's Epoch. After moving to London in 1970, she found an audience through the pages of The London Magazine and Ambit. She and her husband edited the magazine Quark: A Quarterly of Speculative Fiction (4 issues; 1970–71).  Early recognition came for her when Richard Howard, then editor of the New American Review, accepted three of Hacker's poems for publication.

In 1974, when she was thirty-one, Presentation Piece was published by The Viking Press. The book was a Lamont Poetry Selection of the Academy of American Poets and won the annual National Book Award for Poetry. Winter Numbers, which details the loss of many of her friends to AIDS and her own struggle with breast cancer, garnered a Lambda Literary Award and The Nation's Lenore Marshall Poetry Prize.  Her Selected Poems 1965-1990 received the 1996 Poets' Prize, and Squares and Courtyards won the 2001 Audre Lorde Award. She received an Award in Literature from the American Academy of Arts and Letters in 2004.

Hacker often employs strict poetic forms in her poetry: for example, in Love, Death, and the Changing of the Seasons, which is a verse novel in sonnets. She is also recognized as a master of "French forms" such as the rondeau and villanelle.

In 1990 she became the first full-time editor of the Kenyon Review, a position she held until 1994. She was noted for "broaden[ing] the quarterly's scope to include more minority and marginalized viewpoints." In a 2005 essay discussing the theme of food and drink in Hacker's poetry, scholar Mary Biggs describes her work as frequently referring to three "interlinked, paradoxical themes: (1) love and sex; (2) travel, exile, diaspora-counterpoised with family, community, home; and (3) the eternal and, for her, eternally positive association of women with nurturance and with homemaking in the broadest sense."

Hacker served as a Chancellor of the Academy of American Poets from 2008 to 2014.

Hacker lives in New York and Paris and has retired from teaching at the City College of New York and the CUNY Graduate Center.

Though not a character, a poem of Hacker's is reprinted in Heavenly Breakfast, Delany's memoir of a Greenwich Village commune in 1967; in Delany's autobiography, The Motion of Light in Water; and her prose and incidents about her appear in his journals, The Journals of Samuel R. Delany: In Search of Silence, Volume 1, 1957–1969, edited by Kenneth R. James (Wesleyan University Press, 2017).

Hacker was a judge for the 2012 Hippocrates Prize for Poetry and Medicine. In 2013, she was inducted into the New York Writers Hall of Fame. In 2014, she published a collaboration with a Palestinian-American poet, Deema Shehabi, written in the style of a Japanese renga, a form of alternating call and answer. The book, Diaspo/renga: a collaboration in alternating renga explores the emotional journey of living in exile.

In a laudatory review of Hacker's 2019 collection Blazons, A. M. Juster states that "there is no poet writing in English with a better claim for the Nobel Prize in Literature than Marilyn Hacker."

Bibliography

Poetry
 Presentation Piece (1974)  —winner of the National Book Award
 Separations (1976) 
 Taking Notice (1980) 
 Assumptions 1985    
 Love, Death, and the Changing of the Seasons (1986) 
 Going Back to the River (1990) 
 The Hang-Glider's Daughter: New and Selected Poems (1991) 
 Selected Poems: 1965 - 1990 (1994) 
 Winter Numbers: Poems (1995) 
 Squares and Courtyards (2000) 
 Desesperanto: Poems 1999-2002 (2003) 
 First Cities: Collected Early Poems 1960-1979 (2003) 
 Essays on Departure: New and Selected Poems (2006) 
 Names: Poems (2009) 
 A Stranger's Mirror: New and Selected Poems 1994 - 2014 (2015) 
 Blazons: New and Selected Poems, 2000 - 2018 (2019), Carcanet Press,

Translations
 Claire Malroux, Birds and Bison (2005) 
 
 Rachida Madani, Tales of a Severed Head. Trans. Marilyn Hacker. New Haven: Yale UP, 2012.
 Samira Negrouche. The Olive Trees' Jazz and Other Poems.Translator Marilyn Hacker. Pleiades Press, 2020
Jean-Paul de Dadelsen, That Light, All at Once, Translator, Marilyn Hacker, Yale University Press, 2020
Daybreak, Claire Malroux, Translator, Marilyn Hacker, New York Review Books, 2020
The Water People by Vénus Khoury-Ghata, Translator, Marilyn Hacker, The Poetry Translation Centre, U.K. 2022

Anthologies
 (edited with Samuel R. Delany) Quark/1 (1970, science fiction)
 (edited with Samuel R. Delany) Quark/2 (1971, science fiction)
 (edited with Samuel R. Delany) Quark/3 (1971, science fiction)
 (edited with Samuel R. Delany) Quark/4 (1971, science fiction)

Literary criticism
 Hacker, Marilyn. Unauthorized Voices (Poets on Poetry Series, University of Michigan Press, 2010)

References

External links
Marilyn Hacker at www.poets.org
About Marilyn Hacker at Ploughshares

Marilyn Hacker's 'Translator's Preface' to King of a Hundred Horseman
Marilyn Hacker Papers. Yale Collection of American Literature, Beinecke Rare Book and Manuscript Library.

Formalist poets
National Book Award winners
American speculative fiction editors
American speculative fiction translators
American speculative fiction critics
Science fiction editors
Jewish American writers
American lesbian writers
LGBT Jews
American women poets
Lambda Literary Award for Lesbian Poetry winners
People from the Bronx
The Bronx High School of Science alumni
1942 births
Living people
20th-century American poets
21st-century American poets
American LGBT poets
LGBT people from New York (state)
20th-century American women writers
21st-century American women writers
20th-century translators
21st-century translators
American women non-fiction writers
20th-century American non-fiction writers
21st-century American non-fiction writers
People from the East Village, Manhattan
Women speculative fiction editors
21st-century American Jews